Rome Business School is a business school institution offering Master and MBA programs that can be taken both on campus and online, as well as Executive Education training programs.

The School has students coming from more than 150 countries.

History 
The Rome Business School was founded in 2011 in Rome, Italy by Antonio Ragusa and its campus is located in Via Giuseppe Montanelli, 5, Rome. The school launched its activities by offering training and post-graduate Master courses in the field of marketing and other managerial competencies such as Human Resources.

In 2013, the school signed several partnerships with foreign institutes and universities such as the EAE Business School.

Since 2019, Rome Business School is a member of Planeta Formación y Universidades, an international network created by De Agostini and the group Planeta.

Accreditation, Membership & Ranking 
The Rome Business School and its programs are accredited and has membership with the following institutions and organizations:

 EFMD (European Foundation for Management Development)
 ECBE (European Council for Business Education)
 ASFOR (The Italian Association for Management Training)
 PMI (Project Management Institute)
 EADL (European Association For Distant Learning)

Master courses and MBA program 
The Rome Business School’s courses are fully taught in English and can be attended either on campus or online with live lectures. The courses include:

 MBA – Master in Business Administration
 MBA in Luxury and Fashion Management – Rome – Paris
 Master in Marketing and Sales
 Master in International Human Resources Management
 Master in Political Marketing and Communication
 Master in Arts and Culture Management
 Master in Food and Beverage
 Master in Agribusiness Management
 Master in Fashion and Design Management
 Master in Sport & Lifestyle Management
 Master in Tourism Management
 Master in Data Science
 Master in Entrepreneurship and Innovation
 Master in Project Management
 Master in Finance
 Master in Supply Chain Management and Logistic
In addition, the school offer some course only in online learning mode:

 Professional Master in Marketing and Sales
 Professional Master in Human Resources Management
 Professional Master in eHealth Management

With the aim of offering courses also for Italian students who do not speak English, Rome Business School has created the following master's courses in Italian:

 Executive Master in Marketing and Sales
 Executive Master in Human Resources Management
 Executive Master in Project Management
 Executive Master in Data Science

International Partnership 
Rome Business School has partnerships with PACE University (United States), ESLSCA (France) Cyprus Institute of Marketing (Cyprus), Valencian International University (Spain), and obviously, EAE Business School (Spain).

References 

Business schools in Italy
Schools in Rome
Educational institutions established in 2011
2011 establishments in Italy